Peter Holmström is an American rock musician. He is a member of the bands The Dandy Warhols, Pete International Airport, Radis Noir and Rebel Drones. Holmström's first guitar was a Gibson SG. Holmström is also an amateur photographer, and in the past he has also composed music for his sister's theater group.

Musical equipment

Dandy Warhols (2000) gear 
Guitars
1971 Gibson SG with Gibson '57 Pickups
1972 Gibson SG
1972 Fender Telecaster Thinline with Open G Tuning
Fender Bass VI tuned A-A
Tao guitars "air force one" custom made t-bucket model

Pedals
Boss TU-2 Tuner
Electro-Harmonix Big Muff Pi
2 Vintage Rat Pedals
DOD Stereo Flanger
Electro-Harmonix Small Stone
Boss DM-3 Analog Delay
Boss PS-3 Pitch Shifter/Delay
Boss HM-2 Harmonizer
Ernie Ball Volume
Boss RV-3 Reverb/Delay
Boss DM-2 Delay in Wah Wah housing
Z Vex Seek Wah
MXR Dyna Comp
MXR Phase 90
DOD Envelope Filter
Boss DD-5 Digital Delay
Boss PN-2 Tremolo/Panner

Amplifiers
Two Vox AC-30 re-issue w/ blueback speakers

Personal life 
His father, Robert (Bob) Holmström, was an early employee of the Intel Corporation. Holmström attended college in New York City before returning to Portland.
Holmström attended Fairfield Grammar School in Bristol, UK, in the early 1980s.

Discography 
As a member of The Dandy Warhols
 The Dandy Warhols discography

As a member of Pete International Airport
 Pete International Airport (2010)
 Safer With The Wolves... (2017)

As a member of Rebel Drones
 Songs From a Sonic Land

As a member of The Mutants
 Your Desert My Mind

As a member of Sun Atoms
 Let There Be Light (album) (2021), credits: Producer, Bass

References

External links 
 2008 interview
 2012 interview

Year of birth missing (living people)
Living people
American rock guitarists
American male guitarists
Guitarists from Oregon
American people of Swedish descent
American alternative rock musicians
The Dandy Warhols members
Alternative rock guitarists
Musicians from Portland, Oregon
Oregon Episcopal School alumni